Luzzatto (or Luzzato) is an Italian surname. According to a tradition communicated by S. D. Luzzatto, the family descends from a German Jew who immigrated into Italy from the province of Lusatia, and who was named after his native place. 

Notable people with the surname include:

 Amos Luzzatto (1928–2020), Italian Jewish writer
 Carolina Luzzatto (1837–1919), Italian journalist and writer
 Filosseno Luzzatto (1829–1854), Italian Jewish scholar, son of Samuel David Luzzatto
 Laura Luzzatto Dallapiccola, known as Laura Dallapiccola (1911–1995), Italian librarian and translator
 Moshe Chaim Luzzatto (1707–1746), Italian rabbi, kabbalist, and philosopher
 Samuel David Luzzatto (1800–1865), Italian Jewish scholar, and poet
 Simone Luzzatto (1583–1663), Italian rabbi

See also
Emanuele Luzzati
Luigi Luzzatti
Fiorello La Guardia

References

Italian-language surnames
Jewish surnames
Surnames of German origin
Sephardic surnames